Strathpine Centre is an urban shopping centre located in Strathpine, a suburb in Moreton Bay, north of Brisbane.

The centre was built and opened in 1983 by The Westfield Group. It is anchored by Big W and Target discount department stores and Woolworths, Coles and ALDI supermarkets. The centre has a food court anchored by fast food chains such as McDonald's, KFC and Subway . There is also an 8-screen multiplex cinema (operated by Event Cinemas), bowling alley, gaming arcade and a gym on an upper mezzanine level.

Most of the centre is single level with a rooftop carpark. It has a bus station with services to Chermside, Toombul, Redcliffe and local services to surrounding suburbs. Strathpine Centre is about a 10-minute walk to Strathpine Railway Station, with services to Redcliffe and  Springfield Central via Brisbane.

Strathpine Centre has approximately 165 specialty stores mostly within the categories of clothing, general merchandise, homewares and cosmetics.

Prior to September 2015, Scentre Group owned and managed the centre as Westfield Strathpine until it was sold off in August 2015 along with three other centres for a total of $783 Million. The subsequent owner is 151 Property, a subsidiary of The Blackstone Group while JLL is responsible for management of the centre.
On 11 September 2015, management unveiled the centre's new branding and identity going forward.

Myer closure and centre modification
After the closure of the Myer department store at Strathpine on Saturday 3 March 2007, the section of centre where Myer was located was closed off to allow for a redesign. A new mall was unveiled shortly thereafter and at the time of opening featured a Target discount department store, JB Hi-Fi and many other retail stores.

A new 2 level Myer store opened in 2008 at Westfield North Lakes, ensuring that Myer still has a department store in the Moreton Bay region.

Bus interchange 

The Strathpine interchange, at Strathpine, Queensland, is serviced by Translink bus routes. It is part of Strathpine Centre. It is in Zone 2 of the Translink integrated public transport system.

Bus routes 
The following bus routes services Chermside bus station:

See also
List of shopping centres in Australia

References

External links
Strathpine Centre trading website

Shopping centres in Queensland
Former Westfield centres in Australia
Shopping malls established in 1983
Shire of Pine Rivers
1983 establishments in Australia